The Synod of South Australia (also known as Uniting Church SA and formerly Presbytery and Synod of South Australia from 2005 to 2019) is the entity of the Uniting Church in Australia covering most of the state of South Australia. It is one of six geographically-based Synods of the church. The leader of the Synod is the moderator elected to the position for a period of three years. The legal entity for the South Australian branch of the Uniting Church is The Uniting Church in Australia Property Trust (S.A.)

The Uniting Church has a series of inter-related councils, which do not strictly represent a hierarchy. The National Assembly is responsible for issues of doctrine. Each state has a Synod which is responsible for property. Presbyteries are regional councils responsible for the selection, training and oversight of ministers.

Presbyteries and mission networks
A synod may relate to a number of Presbyteries within its bounds. From the beginning of July 2019, the single Presbytery of South Australia divided into a new Generate Presbytery and another Transitional Presbytery. Both presbyteries extend across the entire Synod geography and congregations had the opportunity to choose which presbytery they would belong to. The larger Transitional Presbytery was expected to further divide into two or three later in 2019 along geographical lines. It divided in November 2019 into two parts initially named Presbytery A (north of a line through the centre of Adelaide) and Presbytery B. In March 2020, these presbyteries adopted their new names of Wimala Presbytery and Presbytery of Southern SA.

The Synod of South Australia previously had seven presbyteries, but in 2005 the presbyteries merged, and the structure simplified so that there was one administration and series of meetings for both the Synod and the single Presbytery. As a consequence of the single presbytery having a quite large geographic extent, a series of "mission networks" were established giving congregations a way of relating to similarly-minded congregations and equipping congregations for mission and ministry.

The mission networks were:
 Community Outreach
 Grace Connections
 Gulf
 Hope Network
 Northern Rural
 Urban 
 Western
 3DNet

The original presbyteries in South Australia before 2005 were:
 Adelaide Northwest
 Eyre Peninsula
 Fleurieu
 Frome
 Mount Lofty
 South Eastern (later Presbytery of The Coorong)
 Wakefield

Education
The Uniting College for Leadership and Theology is the theological college of the synod. It is a component of the Adelaide College of Divinity and draws its heritage from both Wesley Theological College and Parkin College.

There are a number of schools associated with the Uniting Church in South Australia. these are:
 Annesley College
 Pedare Christian College
 Prince Alfred College
 Scotch College, Adelaide
 Seymour College
 Westminster School, Adelaide

Lincoln College is a residential college for university students in North Adelaide close to the University of Adelaide.

Moderators

See also 
 Deacon Denise Mary Champion, first ordained Aboriginal person in South Australia

References

External links 
 

Uniting Church in Australia
Religion in South Australia